

Essex

Northern Scotland

Scotland

Results
1983